Rodrigo Nahuel Pacheco (born 15 August 1996) is an Myanmar-Argentine professional footballer who plays as a forward.

Career
Born in Buenos Aires, Pacheco began his career in the youth ranks of Lanús.
After spending time in the Lanús academy, Pacheco signed on loan with new Major League Soccer franchise Los Angeles FC in April 2017, and was immediately loaned to their United Soccer League affiliate Orange County SC for the remainder of the 2017 season.

On October 4, 2017, Pacheco scored his first goal as a professional, helping Orange County SC to a 3–1 victory over Sacramento Republic.

On 9 September 2020, Pacheco joined Thesprotos in Greece.

References

External links
 
 

1996 births
Living people
Association football forwards
Argentine footballers
Club Atlético Lanús footballers
Los Angeles FC players
Orange County SC players
Barracas Central players
Thesprotos F.C. players
USL Championship players
Major League Soccer players
Primera Nacional players
Argentine expatriate footballers
Expatriate soccer players in the United States
Expatriate footballers in Greece
Argentine expatriate sportspeople in the United States
Argentine expatriate sportspeople in Greece
Footballers from Buenos Aires